Kotula or Kotuľa is a surname. It may refer to:

 Andrzej Kotula (1822–1891), Polish lawyer and activist
 Jozef Kotula (born 1976), Slovak footballer
 Juraj Kotula (born 1995), Slovak footballer
 Mirosława Zakrzewska-Kotula (1932–1985), Polish volleyball player, basketball player, handball player and coach
 Peter Kotuľa (born 1982), Slovak musician and singer

See also
 

Polish-language surnames
Slovak-language surnames